Makati Football Club (MFC) is a Philippine youth football club. Founded by Tomas Lozano, the club is a regular participant of the Gothia Cup.

History
The Makati Football Club (MFC) was founded in 1976 by former Real Madrid player Tomas Lozano. The club has been sending numerous youth teams to the Gothia Cup in Sweden since 1983. MFC has sent both boys' and girls' sides. MFC's best finish in the tournament was in 1985, where its boys under-11 team won their age-group's tournament. Other podium finishes were third place for the boy's under-12 in 1986, and another third place finish for the boy's under-12 in 2016

MFC entered a partnership with Alaska Milk Corporation in 1996 which led to the establishment of the recurring Alaska Cup youth football tournament.

In 2019, MFC's entered a partnership with Philippines Football League club Stallion Laguna with its football academy merging with Stallion's for at least the 2019 season.

The COVID-19 pandemic disrupted the club's operation. The 2021 Gothia Cup, which MFC was due to participate for the 38th time, was cancelled. MFC's football academy also resorted to conducting its sporting programs online.

MFC is set to return to competing in football competitions outside the Philippines since the start of the pandemic. They are to participate in the 2022 edition of the JSSL Singapore Professional Academy 7s.

Notable players
List of notable players who have played for Makati F.C. and/or have attended its Makati Football School.

Aly Borromeo – Philippines men's national team player
Sara Castañeda – Philippines women's national team player

Honors 
 Gothia Cup:
Winners: 1985 (Boys U11)
Third place: 1986 (Boys U12), 2016 (Boys U12)

References

1976 establishments in the Philippines
Youth football in the Philippines
Football clubs in the Philippines
Sport in Makati